Petryakhino is a rural locality (a village) in Zabolotskoye Rural Settlement, Permsky District, Perm Krai, Russia. The population was 15 as of 2010. There are 3 streets.

Geography 
Petryakhino is located 39 km southwest of Perm (the district's administrative centre) by road. Demino is the nearest rural locality.

References 

Rural localities in Permsky District